The 33rd Grey Cup was played on December 1, 1945, before 18,660 fans at Varsity Stadium at Toronto.

The Toronto Argonauts defeated the Winnipeg Blue Bombers 35–0.

External links
 
 

Grey Cup
Grey Cup
Grey Cups hosted in Toronto
1945 in Ontario
December 1945 sports events in Canada
1940s in Toronto
Toronto Argonauts
Winnipeg Blue Bombers